Yingjiang County is a county in Dehong Prefecture, Yunnan province, China, bordering Burma's Kachin State to the west.

Geography 
The Danzha River and Binglang River meet near Jiucheng and become the Daying River (Dàyíngjiāng). The Daying then flows through Yingjiang County into Myanmar and into the Irrawaddy River, with the confluence near Bhamo. The Daying is known as the Taping (大平江; Dàpíng Jiāng) in Myanmar.

Yingjiang county is mountainous with several alluvial plains. The county has various climate types, with ranges from the tropical, the subtropical, to the temperate zones. Intact forests can be seen in the mountains above .

Yingjiang is abundant in hydroelectric, forest, and geothermal resources. There are 21 hot springs, six of which are above . Most of the hot springs are distributed within the Daying River system.

The county is within a very active seismic zone, and have been struck in 2008, 2009 and 2011 by violent earthquakes.

Climate

History 
Yingjiang county became part of Chinese territory for the first time in the Western Han dynasty. It was under control of Yizhou Prefecture (益州郡) (Yìzhōu jùn) in the Western Han dynasty. During the Eastern Han, the Shu Han, the Western Jin, and the Eastern Jin, it was governed by Ailao county (哀牢縣) (Āiláo xiàn), Yongchang Prefecture (永昌郡)  (Yǒngchāng jùn), and then by Xicheng county (西城縣) (Xīchéng xiàn) from the Southern Qi dynasty in 479.

Actually, from 320s on, the Cuan (爨) (Cuàn) family began to control Yunnan. China was very unstable during the Northern and Southern Dynasties, and the central governments had no force to control Yunnan. The Cuan family took the strategy by which they recognized the nominal sovereignty of the central governments while remaining themselves as the real local rulers. In this way, the Cuan family had controlled Yunnan for more than 400 years until it was conquered by Nanzhao in 769.

Yingjiang was ruled by Nanzhao and later by Dali from the 8th to the 13th century and hence was not governed by China during the Tang dynasty and the Song dynasty. It was conquered by the Mongols and again became part of the Chinese territory. During the Ming dynasty and the Qing dynasty, Yingjiang was governed by local chiefs under the "Tusi system" (土司制度) (Tǔsī Zhìdù), i.e. the Native Chieftain system, in which the central government had the nominal sovereignty.

Administrative divisions
Yingjiang County has 8 towns, 6 townships and 1 ethnic township. 
8 towns

6 townships

1 ethnic township
 Sudian Lisu

Sights 
Yunyan Pagoda (允燕塔)(Yǔnyàn Tǎ).

A great flood occurred in Yingjiang in 1946. For Buddha's blessing, a pagoda was proposed. The construction of Yuyan Pagoda began in 1947 and was completed in 1952.

Hutiaoshi (虎跳石)(Hǔtiàoshí)

With the waterfall and the steep cliffs, Hutiaoshi is a famous attraction.

Tongbiguan Natural Protection Area (銅壁關自然保護區)(Tóngbìguān Zìrán Bǎohùqū)

The Tongbiguan Natural Protection Area was established in 1986. The vegetation in the area displays an obvious vertical distribution. The Tongbiguan Natural Protection Area offers a shelter to many rare or endangered species.

See also
 Trimeresurus yingjiangensis, the Yingjiang green pitviper, a snake species named after Yingjiang

Notes

External links 
Yingjiang County Official Website
Map of Dehong
Tusi (Chinese version of Wikipedia)
Treaties concerning the non-navigational uses of international watercourses - Asia.  Boundary Treaty between the Union of Burma and the People's Republic of China, signed at Peking on 1 October 1960. p.32. (pdf)
Dehong Prefecture Government Public Information Website - Yingjiang County
Earthquake-Report.com extensive coverage of the Yingjiang 2011 earthquake

 
County-level divisions of Dehong Prefecture